The Artificial Reef Society of British Columbia (ARSBC) is a registered non-profit society based in Vancouver, British Columbia (BC), and is a registered tax-deductible charity in Canada.

Its aim is to create environmentally and economically sustainable 'artificial reefs' in British Columbia and around the world for the protection and enhancement of sensitive marine habitats, while also providing interesting destinations for the enjoyment of scuba divers.

Since 1991, the Society has sunk seven ships and one Boeing 737 in the waters off BC's west coast.

The Society has no paid employees, and consists of a volunteer Board of Directors and hundreds of volunteers from BC, Alberta, and the northwest United States who have worked on its projects. Its mission is to create and maintain artificial reefs for use by scuba divers as a means to promote the local economy, the technology and safety procedures involved in creating artificial reefs, promote the use of artificial reefs to minimize the impact caused by scuba divers on other historically significant or ecologically sensitive sites, and to monitor all developments regarding their artificial reefs for environmental impact and diver safety.

Artificial reefs 
Sunk August 11, 1991: MV G.B. Church off Portland Island, near Sidney, BC at 48°43.323′ N, 123°21.339′ W 
Sunk June 22, 1996:  (II) off Maud Island, near Campbell River, BC at 50°8.031′ N, 125°20.152′ W 
Sunk June 14, 1997:  (II) off Snake Island, near Nanaimo, BC at 49°12.96′ N, 123°53.070′ W 
Sunk October 20, 2001:  (II) off Snake Island, near Nanaimo, BC at 49°12.88′ N, 123°53.067′ W 
Sunk January 14, 2006: Xihwu Boeing 737-200 off Chemainus, BC at 48°56.142′ N, 123°43.130′ W 

References

External links 

Artificial reefs
Environmental organizations based in British Columbia
Non-profit organizations based in Vancouver
Diver organizations